Sasykovo is a rural locality (a village) in Suksunsky District, Perm Krai, Russia. The population was 124 as of 2010. There are 6 streets.

Geography 
Sasykovo is located 8 km northeast of Suksun (the district's administrative centre) by road. Pepelyshi is the nearest rural locality.

References 

Rural localities in Perm Krai